Left Side Brain are an English-Welsh rock band from Bristol, England, who have released three albums on Bristol-based independent label Sugar Shack Records. Kerrang! described the band as "one of the brightest lights in British rock".

Discography

Albums
 Equal and Opposite (2004)
 Action Potential (2006)
 Collider (2009)
 Rifftrospective: Ten Years of Left Side Brain (2010)

EPs
 Surface Tension EP (2004)

Compilation appearances
Kerrang! New Breed (2006) "Well Well Well" 
Pledge: A Tribute to Kerbdog (2010) "Severed"

References

External links 
 Official web site

Musical quartets
English alternative rock groups
English rock music groups
Musical groups from Bristol